Bagas Maulana (born 20 July 1998) is an Indonesian badminton player affiliated with Djarum club.

Career 
In the junior event, Maulana won a boys' doubles Junior Grand Prix title in 2016 partnered with Muhammad Fachrikar.

In 2018, Maulana teamed-up with Muhammad Shohibul Fikri, finished as runner-up at the Indonesia International. He and his partner won their first International title at the 2019 Finnish Open. He then claimed his first World Tour title at the Hyderabad Open.

In 2021, Maulana and Fikri finished as runner-up at the Belgian International defeated by their compatriots Pramudya Kusumawardana and Yeremia Rambitan in the final.

2022 
In March, he and his partner Muhammad Shohibul Fikri  participated in 2022 All England Open for the first time. They defeated number 8 seeds Ong Yew Sin and Teo Ee Yi in the second round, the reigning world champion Takuro Hoki and Yugo Kobayashi in quarterfinals, World number 1 Marcus Fernaldi Gideon and Kevin Sanjaya Sukamuljo in the semifinals and World number 2 Mohammad Ahsan and Hendra Setiawan in the final, thus clinching their first Super 1000 title.

2023 
Maulana and Fikri opened the 2023 season at the Malaysia Open, but defeated in the second round to Indian pair Satwiksairaj Rankireddy and Chirag Shetty. In the next tournament, India Open, they suffered second round defeat to fellow Indonesian pair of Fajar Alfian and Muhammad Rian Ardianto. They competed in the home tournament, Indonesia Masters, but unfortunately lost in the quarter-finals from 2nd seed Japanese pair Takuro Hoki and Yugo Kobayashi. In the next tournament, Thailand Masters, they suffered semi-finals defeat to Chinese Taipei pair of Su Ching-heng and Ye Hong-wei.

Achievements

BWF World Tour (2 titles) 
The BWF World Tour, which was announced on 19 March 2017 and implemented in 2018, is a series of elite badminton tournaments sanctioned by the Badminton World Federation (BWF). The BWF World Tours are divided into levels of World Tour Finals, Super 1000, Super 750, Super 500, Super 300 (part of the HSBC World Tour), and the BWF Tour Super 100.

Men's doubles

BWF International Challenge/Series (1 title, 2 runners-up) 
Men's doubles

  BWF International Challenge tournament
  BWF International Series tournament

BWF Junior International (1 title) 
Boys' doubles

  BWF Junior International Grand Prix tournament
  BWF Junior International Challenge tournament
  BWF Junior International Series tournament
  BWF Junior Future Series tournament

Performance timeline 
Performance timeline

National team 
 Junior level

 Senior level

Individual competitions 
 Junior level

 Senior level

References

External links 
 

1998 births
Living people
Sportspeople from Cilacap Regency
Indonesian male badminton players
21st-century Indonesian people